Hooligans: Storm Over Europe is a video game recreating the hooliganism which often accompanies international football matches throughout much of Europe.

The game was released in 2002 on the PC platform to immediate controversy due to its violent content and the perceived promotion of criminal behaviour in football, with some politicians calling for it to be banned. A similar media and political reaction had occurred on release of other controversial video games at the time such as Grand Theft Auto, Postal and Carmageddon, all of which featured or encouraged behaviour which would be illegal in real life; for instance, the Grand Theft Auto series features carjacking, excessive speeding and running over pedestrians. The Dutch producers of the game, Darxabre, defended the title stating that it rewarded strategic thinking rather than violence (see BBC News).

Overview
The game is played out over a football season and the object of the game is to become the most notorious group of hooligans in Europe in a documentary where one of the reporters who is a former hooligan himself joins the local firm in the Netherlands for a tour around Europe during a continental championship and their attempt to see that the Dutch gets the cup; through any means necessary. In order to achieve this the player proceeds through a variety of levels set in different locations and must injure or kill every opposing hooligan gang.

The Hooligans are divided to several classes, the Leader is the central member to the entire squad and the only one able to use handguns and rally his men and other members of the firm. The Rat acts as a scout and can break into residential places without alerting the law, but has limited stamina and easily gets drunk and high. The Hooligan is the demolitions expert and is used for crowd control. The Raver is a party-going member who can distract other gang members by using his loud boombox and has strong drug tolerance, but low alcoholic tolerance. The Biker and Bulch have the most health but the Biker can drive any car, using it as a transport or as a weapon against enemies. The Bulch is one of the three major units, an overweight dumb man who functions as the muscle, beating up other hooligans as well as being able to push certain objects to limit the movement of the enemy.

During play the members of the gang must be sustained by administering drugs, alcohol and violence on a regular basis. Failure to keep the gang members fueled will see them drift off to more peaceful and legal activities. Looting of the local shops during the game can provide funds for the gang, and the player must overcome resistance from both rival gangs and the police forces to achieve victory.

External links
(BBC Reports On "Armchair Hooligans" BBC News).
(Hooligans: Storm Over Europe Gaming Community H:SOE Community).
(Hooligans: Storm Over Europe not official trailer )

2002 video games
Association football hooliganism
Censored video games
Obscenity controversies in video games
Real-time tactics video games
Single-player video games
Windows games
Windows-only games
Video games developed in the Netherlands
Video games set in Europe